The New York Yankees are a Major League Baseball franchise based in the New York City borough of The Bronx. Also known in their early years as the "Baltimore Orioles" (1901–02) and the "New York Highlanders" (1903–1912), the Yankees have had eleven pitchers throw twelve no-hitters in franchise history. A no-hitter is officially recognized by Major League Baseball only "...when a pitcher (or pitchers) allows no hits during the entire course of a game, which consists of at least nine innings. In a no-hit game, a batter may reach base via a walk, an error, a hit by pitch, a passed ball or wild pitch on strike three, or catcher's interference". No-hitters of less than nine complete innings were previously recognized by the league as official; however, several rule alterations in 1991 changed the rule to its current form. Three perfect games, a special subcategory of no-hitter, have been pitched in Yankees history. As defined by Major League Baseball, "in a perfect game, no batter reaches any base during the course of the game." This feat was achieved by Don Larsen in 1956, David Wells in 1998, and David Cone in 1999. Wells later claimed he was a "little hung-over" while throwing his perfect game.

George Mogridge threw the first no-hitter in Yankees history, beating their rival Boston Red Sox 2–1, their only no-hitter in which the opposition scored. Their most recent no-hitter was Corey Kluber's no-hitter against the Texas Rangers during the 2021 season on May 19th. It was the first no-hitter thrown by a Yankee since David Cone’s perfect game in 1999. The Yankees' first perfect game was also thrown by a right-handed pitcher, Don Larsen, and came in Game 5 of the 1956 World Series. Larsen's perfect game was the only no-hitter in MLB postseason play until Roy Halladay of the Philadelphia Phillies pitched a no-hitter in Game 1 of the 2010 National League Division Series. Coincidentally, Cone's perfect game came on "Yogi Berra Day" at Yankee Stadium. Berra had caught Larsen's perfect game and both he and Larsen were in the stands for the game. Of the eleven no-hitters pitched by Yankees players, three each have been won by the scores 4–0 and 2–0, more common than any other result. The largest margin of victory in a Yankees no-hitter was 13 runs, in a 13–0 win by Monte Pearson.

Andy Hawkins lost a game on July 1, 1990 to the Chicago White Sox while on the road by the score of 4–0 without allowing a hit. Because the White Sox were winning entering the ninth inning at home, they did not bat, and thus Hawkins pitched only 8 innings, but the game was considered a no-hitter at the time. However, following rules changes in 1991, the game is no longer counted as a no-hitter. Additionally, Tom L. Hughes held the Cleveland Indians without a hit through the first nine innings of a game on August 6, 1910 but the game went into extra innings and he lost the no-hitter in the tenth inning and ultimately lost the game 5–0.

The longest interval between Yankees no-hitters was between the game pitched by Larsen on October 8, 1956 and Dave Righetti's no hitter on July 4, 1983, encompassing 26 years, 8 months, and 26 days. The shortest gap between such games fell between Allie Reynolds' two no-hitters in 1951, a gap of just 2 months and 16 days from July 12 till September 28. Reynolds is the only Yankees pitcher to throw multiple no-hitters in his career, and one of only six pitchers in Major League history to throw multiple no-hitters in a season along with Max Scherzer in 2015, Roy Halladay in 2010, Nolan Ryan in 1973, Virgil Trucks in 1952, and Johnny Vander Meer in 1938. The Red Sox and the Cleveland Indians have been no-hit by the Yankees more than any other franchise, each doing so three times. Notably, Reynolds' two no-hit victims in 1951 were the Red Sox and the Indians.

No umpire has called multiple Yankee no-hitters. Bill Dinneen, the umpire who called Sad Sam Jones' 1923 no-hitter, is the only person in MLB history to both pitch (for the Red Sox in 1905) and umpire (five total, including Jones') a no-hitter. The plate umpire for Larsen's perfect game, Babe Pinelli, apocryphally "retired" after that game, but that is mere legend; in reality, since Larsen's perfecto was only Game 5 of the seven-game Series, Pinelli didn't officially retire until two days later, concluding his distinguished umpiring career at second base during Game 7, not at home plate during Game 5.

No-hitters

See also

List of Major League Baseball no-hitters

References
General reference

Inline citations

No-hitters
New York Yankees